Tridrepana hypha is a moth in the family Drepanidae. It was described by Hong-Fu Chu and Lin-Yao Wang in 1988. It is found in Yunnan, China.

Adults are similar to Tridrepana finita, but larger and there are two brownish black spots near the lower angle of the cell on the forewings. The postmedial line is thin, wavy and nearly continuous.

References

Moths described in 1988
Drepaninae